Sondy M. Pope (born April 27, 1950) is a retired American nonprofit executive and Democratic politician from Dane County, Wisconsin.  She served 20 years in the Wisconsin State Assembly, from 2003 through 2022.  She represented the 79th Assembly district for the first 10 years, then represented the 80th district after the 2011 redistricting.

Early life and family
Pope was born in Madison; she graduated from River Valley High School in Spring Green and attended Madison Area Technical College and Edgewood College. Prior to election to the Assembly, she was a staff member for the Foundation for Madison's Public Schools. She is married with one daughter.

Legislative career
Pope first ran for the Assembly to represent the 79th district (western parts of Madison and Middleton, Blue Mounds, Cross Plains, Fitchburg, Mount Horeb, Springdale, Vermont, and Verona) in 2000 against Republican incumbent Rick Skindrud, but lost by 13,765 to 18,510 for Skindrud and 887 for independent Bob Menamin.

She was re-nominated in 2002, and unseated Skindrud, with a vote of 12,311 to Skindrud's 10,865. She was assigned to the standing committees on aging and long-term care; education; rural affairs; and small business.

She was re-elected in 2004, after an unsuccessful challenge in the Democratic primary election from Manamin; re-elected in 2006 (without opposition), 2008 and 2010; and as of 2011 is ranking minority member of the Assembly's standing committee on education, and a member of the committees on housing, and on children and families.

References

External links
Wisconsin Assembly - Representative Sondy Pope official government website
 official campaign website
 
 Follow the Money - Sondy Pope-Roberts
2008 2006 2004 2002 2000 campaign contributions
Campaign 2008 campaign contributions at Wisconsin Democracy Campaign

Democratic Party members of the Wisconsin State Assembly
1950 births
Edgewood College alumni
Living people
Madison Area Technical College alumni
Women state legislators in Wisconsin
21st-century American politicians
21st-century American women politicians
Politicians from Madison, Wisconsin